Danis danis, the large green-banded blue, is a species of butterfly in the family Lycaenidae. This species can be found in the Australia and New Guinea. Larvae feed on Alphitonia excelsa.

Subspecies
 D. d. danis - Ambon 
 D. d. serapis Miskin, 1891 - Australia: Cairns to Tully
 D. d. syrius Miskin, 1890 - Australia: Cape York
 D. d. apollonius (C. & R. Felder, 1865) - New Guinea
 D. d. supous (Druce & Bethune-Baker, 1893) - Aru
 D. d. triopus (de Nicéville, 1898) - Kai
 D. d. hermes (Grose-Smith, 1894) - West Irian
 D. d. zuleika (Grose-Smith, 1898) - Louisiades Archipelago
 D. d. regina (Kirby, 1889) - D'Entrecasteaux Archipelago
 D. d. lampros (Druce, 1897) - Trobriand Islands
 D. d. karpaia (Druce & Bethune-Baker, 1893) - Serang
 D. d. philocrates (Fruhstorfer, 1915) - Obi
 D. d. panatius (Fruhstorfer, 1915) - Salawatti
 D. d. sophron (Fruhstorfer, 1915) - Buru
 D. d. herophilus (Fruhstorfer, 1915) - Waigeu
 D. d. anaximenes (Fruhstorfer, 1915) - Kumusi
 D. d. proedrus (Fruhstorfer, 1915) - Owgarra
 D. d. philostratus (C. & R. Felder, 1865) - Bachan, Halmahera, Moratai, Ternate, Waigeu
 D. d. dispar (Grose-Smith & Kirby, 1895) - Bismarck Archipelago
 D. d. latifascia (Rothschild, 1915) - Admiralty Islands

References

Danis (butterfly)
Butterflies described in 1775
Taxa named by Pieter Cramer